Harold Antone Lytie (June 9, 1899 in Portage County, Wisconsin – June 5, 1961 in Green Bay, Wisconsin) was a member of the Wisconsin State Assembly and Wisconsin State Senate.

Biography
Lytie was born on June 9, 1899 in Portage County, Wisconsin. He would become a barber.

Political career
Lytie was a member of the Assembly from 1937 to 1942 and of the Senate from 1945 to 1948. Additionally, he was an unsuccessful candidate for the Senate in 1956 and 1960. He was a Democrat.

References

People from Portage County, Wisconsin
Democratic Party Wisconsin state senators
Democratic Party members of the Wisconsin State Assembly
Barbers
1899 births
1961 deaths
20th-century American politicians